Rochelle Cooper Dreyfuss is an American attorney who is the Pauline Newman Professor of Law and Co-Director of the Engelberg Center on Innovation Law & Policy at New York University School of Law.

Biography
Dreyfuss grew up in Brooklyn, New York. She studied at Wellesley College, where she obtained a B.A. degree in chemistry, and then received a M.A. from the University of California, Berkeley. After working as a research scientist, she graduated from Columbia Law School in 1981, where she was a James Kent Scholar and served as articles and book review editor of the Columbia Law Review. After law school, Dreyfuss was law clerk for Judge Wilfred Feinberg of the United States Court of Appeals for the Second Circuit and then for Chief Justice Warren Burger of the Supreme Court of the United States during the 1982–1983 term.

In 1983 she joined the faculty of New York University School of Law, and in 1988 was named a full professor. Her research focuses on patent law, copyright and intellectual property. In 1996, she became the director of the Engelberg Center on Innovation Law and Policy, and is currently the co-director. She is co-author of a case book, Intellectual Property-Cases and Materials on Trademark, Copyright and Patent Law, originally published in 1996.

She is a member of the American Law Institute and was a reporter for its 2008 study, Intellectual Property: Principles Governing Jurisdiction, Choice of Law, and Judgments in Transnational Disputes.

See also 
 List of law clerks of the Supreme Court of the United States (Chief Justice)

References

Select publications

Books
 , and 2010 Supplement  (1st ed. 1996)

Articles

External links
 Bio, NYU Law
 Author page, Amazon.com
 Appearances on C-SPAN.org

People from Mount Vernon, New York
Year of birth missing (living people)
1940s births
Living people
20th-century American lawyers
21st-century American lawyers
Wellesley College alumni
University of California, Berkeley alumni
Columbia Law School alumni
Law clerks of the Supreme Court of the United States
New York University School of Law faculty
Patent law scholars
American legal scholars
American women academics
20th-century American women
21st-century American women